Jade Louise (born 15 June 1983) is an Australian-New Zealand singer who is best known for her hit single "Vibrations" (featuring Savage) which was the opening theme of the television series The GC and reached number seven on the New Zealand Singles Chart in 2012. In 2011, she was a finalist of X-Factor.

References

External links 
JadeLouise

1983 births
People from the Gold Coast, Queensland
Living people
Musicians from Gold Coast, Queensland
21st-century Australian women singers
21st-century New Zealand women singers